Veintisiete (Eng.: Twenty Seven) is the title of a cover album released by romantic music group Los Temerarios. This album became their sixth number-one set on the Billboard Top Latin Albums and received a nomination for a Grammy Award for Best Mexican/Mexican-American Album. This album has gone double-platinum in US.

Track listing
The information from Billboard

CD track listing

DVD track listing
This information from Allmusic.

Personnel
This information from Allmusic.
Adolfo Ángel Alba — Arranger, keyboards, producer, direction
Rudy Pérez — Arranger, keyboards, producer, direction
Ernesto Abrego — Music coordinator 
Gabriel Martínez — Engineer
Bruce Weeden — Engineer, mixing
Clay Perry — Keyboards, programming
Felix Alcala — drums
Jose Luis Ayala — Drums
Andres Bermudez — Mixing
Joel Numa — Mixing
Jose Esquivel — Trumpet
Xavier Serano — Trumpet 
Julio Hernandez — Bass
Manny López — Guitar
Wendy Pedersen — vocals
Javier Solís — Vocals
Cornelio Reyna — Vocals
Angela Duque — Graphic design

Chart performance

Sales and certifications

References

2004 albums
Los Temerarios albums
Fonovisa Records albums
Albums produced by Rudy Pérez